The 2012 Brasil Open was a tennis tournament played on indoor clay courts. It was the 12th edition of the event known as the Brasil Open, and was part of the ATP World Tour 250 series of the 2012 ATP World Tour. It took place from February 13 through February 19, 2012, in São Paulo, Brazil for the first time, since the previous tournaments were held in Costa do Sauípe, Brazil. The competition was also moved from an outdoor event to indoors and was played at the Complexo Desportivo Constâncio Vaz Guimarães.

Singles main draw entrants

Seeds

 Seeds are based on Rankings as of February 6, 2012.

Other entrants
The following players received wildcards into the singles main draw:
 Nicolás Almagro
 Fernando González
 Javier Martí

The following players received entry from the qualifying draw:
  Igor Andreev
  Paul Capdeville
  Jérémy Chardy
  Rubén Ramírez Hidalgo

Withdrawals
 Juan Ignacio Chela (personal reasons)
 Tommy Robredo (adductor injury)

Doubles main draw entrants

Seeds

 Rankings are as of February 6, 2012

Other entrants
The following pairs received wildcards into the doubles main draw:
  Guilherme Clezar /  Caio Zampieri
  Rogério Dutra da Silva /  Bruno Sant'anna

Finals

Singles

 Nicolás Almagro defeated  Filippo Volandri, 6–3, 4–6, 6–4
It was Almagro's 1st title of the year and 11th of his career. It was his 3rd win at the event, also winning in 2008 and 2011.

Doubles

 Eric Butorac /  Bruno Soares defeated  Michal Mertiňák /  André Sá, 3–6, 6–4, [10–8]

References

External links
Official website

 
Brasil Open